Rye malt whiskey, under US regulations, is a whiskey produced via a mash primarily consisting of malted rye. It is distinct from rye whiskey due to the malting step, and is distinct from unqualified malt whiskey, which is made from malted barley, not rye.

Examples of rye malt whiskey are primarily American, such as Old Pogue, North American Steamship Rye, or Old Potrero brands.

See also
 Outline of whisky
 Starka

References

External links
 

Malt whisky
Rye whiskey